"Levels" is a progressive house song by Swedish DJ Avicii that was released on 28 October 2011 through Universal Music Group on iTunes. "Levels" topped the Swedish Singles Chart. Outside Sweden, "Levels" topped the charts in Norway and peaked within the top ten of the charts in Austria, Belgium, Denmark, Netherlands, the Republic of Ireland, Switzerland and the United Kingdom and received a platinum certification eight times in Sweden, twice in the United Kingdom, and once in the United States.

Before the song's release, an early version known as "Unnamed" played during a radio program on BBC Radio 1 in the United Kingdom on 11 December 2010. The final version was not played until the Ultra Music Festival in March 2011, where it was referred to as "ID." Afterward, "Levels" played in many clubs and festivals around the world before its eventual release on iTunes. Avicii has stated that he made the song so that he could incorporate a vocal sample from the 1962 gospel-inspired song "Something's Got a Hold on Me" by Etta James.

The music video was directed by Petro Papahadjopoulos, who came up with the concept after a phone interview with Avicii about the supposed "symbolism" behind "Levels." The video is about a businessman who starts dancing in his office in front of his co-workers and boss before being stunned by an officer and sent to the hospital. All the hospital workers slowly start dancing against their own free will after two of them touch a flower sprouted out of the businessman's mouth.

Development and release

In an interview with Artist Direct'''s editor-in-chief, Rick Florino, Avicii expressed a desire to use a vocal sample from Etta James' "Something's Got a Hold on Me". He said that "After I came up with the 'Levels' hook, I tried using the vocal over it, and it worked really well". He then mentioned that his producer, Arash Pournouri, made a deal with "our label" for promoting the song. Avicii has stated that he did not expect the song to be so popular. In an interview with The Austin Times, where he was asked if he intended for the song to be a big hit, he responded by saying "Not at all". Avicii then said that it took a long time to become a hit and that he is still surprised by the popularity of "Levels". In an interview from Bryce, a host from the radio station, WNYL, DJ Mike Posner claimed that he was sent "Levels" by Avicii while it was still in production to provide vocals to it. Posner produced six "toplines" but did not use them, saying that, "they were good, but not... the thing".

An early prototype of "Levels" was first played in BBC Radio 1's Essential Mix on 11 December 2010, initially referred to as "Unnamed". An even earlier prototype using an electric piano as baseline instrument was not released until 19 August 2015 on Instagram. The first time the final version was played was during the Ultra Music Festival on 25 March 2011. It was referred to as "ID". On 12 May 2011, Avicii linked to a preview version of the song on SoundCloud via Facebook, still referring to it as "ID". After the 2011 Ultra Music Festival, "Levels" was played in many festivals and clubs around the world. During this time, a bootleg leak of "Levels" was posted on YouTube and gained over 15 million views. On 27 October 2011, Avicii posted on his YouTube channel a promo trailer of the song "Levels", which featured clips of many of the pre-release performances of "Levels" and placed the release date to October/November 2011. "Levels" was released via iTunes on 28 October 2011 in Australia, Denmark, Ireland, Netherlands, the United Kingdom, and Sweden. On 31 October 2011, Universal Music Group posted a teaser on YouTube. The trailer features the cover art of "Levels" with added effects on it including the elevator door opening and the light flickering. The same day, "Levels" was released via iTunes in the United States.

Composition

"Levels" is a progressive house song produced in a dance style and composed in a key of C minor with a tempo of 127 BPM. The song's main aspect is its simple synth hook that is divided into two phrases. The synth hook, which is accompanied by a chord progression of Cm–E–B–A, is repeated throughout most of the song.

In the middle of the song, the synth hooks drop and the drums are cut out, being replaced by an echoing sound that sounds like a chorus. A sample of the intro to Etta James's "Something's Got a Hold on Me" is played. After the interlude, the synth hooks, and the drumbeat start up again along with a synth line that rises fast before slowly dropping. It was referred to by Billboard as a "briefly burbling whistle sound that augments the hook..."

Critical reception

Since its release, "Levels" has generated very positive reviews from music critics for its catchy and recognizable synth riff, and has become known as one of the greatest songs of all time, both in EDM and in general. In 2012, the song was nominated for "Best Electro/Dance" and won "Best Song" in the Grammis Awards. In 2013, the song was nominated for "Best Dance Recording" on the Grammy Awards.

AllMusic critic, David Jefferies, described "Levels" as a "simple and effective EDM monster that launched Swedish producer Avicii to Swedish House Mafia, Afrojack, or Tiesto, erm, levels." Anje Riberra, on the Spanish news site, El Correo, called the song a "very danceable tune that makes you enjoy it continuously." In Billboard's Avicii's 10 Best Songs: Critics' Picks list, "Levels" was placed at number one and described as "quite possibly one of the biggest dance music songs ever recorded." Billboard, in a separate article, has described in detail why "Levels" was one of the best songs in the world. Kat Bein from Miami New Times called the song, "a worldwide anthem" and said that Avicii is "part of a whole new generation of young producers helping make EDM the biggest youth culture movement since boy bands."

DJ producer, Joe Bermudez, when talking about "Levels" said that "Avicii's uplifting chord progressions instantly transport club goers to euphoric state." Music artist Zedd said it is the one song he wished he had produced, saying "...there is something about the genius simplicity of this song; the unbelievably anthemic and powerful emotion I feel when I hear it." The song was put on CULTR's "11 Best Dance & EDM of 2011" as number 11, praised for its "iconic melody that is still catchy to this day." Pitchfork ranked "Levels" as the 200th best song of the 2010s, praising the song for its "...monumental synths and jetstream whooshes..." while on New York's subsidiary, The Vulture, Emily Yoshida praised the song for its "central hook, stabbing, skyscraper-tall synth line, shiny and sleek and feeling like it could touch God..." Future Music called "Levels", interesting because of its composition and its example of how "...a simple part can become complex." One criticism of "Levels" came from Simon Darnell on MK News, where he praised "Levels" for the vocals appearing for brief moment, but otherwise criticized the song for being "utterly predictable, right down to the end."

Commercial performance
"Levels" found the most chart success in Avicii's native Sweden, peaking at number 1 on the Swedish charts the week of 11 November 2011. It maintained its peak position for seven weeks. It was Avicii's fifth song to make it to Sverigetopplistan's weekly charts. "Levels" was part of three consecutive year-end charts, reaching number 23 in 2011, number 3 in 2012, and number 43 in 2013. After leaving the charts in 2013, it made a return in the week of 24 April 2018 as number 4 and was on charts for four months. That same year, it was placed as number 54 on the year-end charts. "Levels" was also on the charts on two non-consecutive weeks in 2019, the week of 4 January as number 94, and the week of 19 April as number 77. It has received a platinum certification eight times from the Swedish Recording Industry Association, indicating that "Levels" has been shipped to Sweden 320,000 times.

"Levels" was also very successful in the United States, entering the weekly Hot 100 charts in the week of 11 December 2011 at number 66. "Levels" was the first song Avicii released that entered Billboard'''s weekly Hot 100 charts. The song stayed on the Hot 100 for 20 weeks, reaching its peak as number 60 on the week of 17 February 2012. On other charts, It stayed on the Mainstream Top 40 for 5 weeks, reaching its peak position of number 33 on 9 March 2012. It reached a peak position of number two on Dance/Mix Show Airplay on 24 February 2012 and was on the chart for 29 weeks, and it reached a peak position of number 1 on Dance Club Songs on 30 December 2011 and was on the chart for 20 weeks. On the year-end charts, It reached number 32 on the year-end Dance Club Songs chart, and number 11 on the year-end Dance/Mix Show Airplay chart. It earned a platinum certification by the Recording Industry Association of America on 9 January 2013, indicating that it was shipped to the US over one million times. It had previously been awarded the gold certification on 27 March 2012.

"Levels" was also successful in the UK and Norway. In the UK, "Levels" entered the "Official Singles Chart Top 100" on the week of 27 November 2011 at its peak position of number four. It stayed on the chart for 50 weeks and left the charts after its position of number 96 in the week of 16 September 2012. On UK's "Official Dance Singles Chart Top 40," it peaked as number one on the week of 25 December 2011. In the year-end charts of UK, it was number 101 in 2011, and number 59 in 2012. In Norway, "Levels" entered the charts on the week of 7 November 2011 as number four. It peaked as number one on the week of 17 December 2011 and stayed number one for four weeks. It was on the Norwegian charts for around 30 weeks. "Levels" was certified in both the United Kingdom and Norway. In Norway, the International Federation of the Phonographic Industry awarded "Levels" a platinum certification five times, indicating that 50,000 copies were sold in Norway. In the United Kingdom, "Levels" earned a platinum certification twice from the British Phonographic Industry, indicating that it was sold and streamed 1,200,000 times in the United Kingdom. In other nations, it reached a peak position of number 5 in Switzerland, number 4 in Austria, Netherlands, and Belgium, and number 3 in Denmark and Ireland. "Levels" has also received a platinum certification at least once from Australia, Austria, Belgium, Denmark, Germany, Italy, and Switzerland.

Music video

Background
According to director Petro Papahadjopoulos, he was approached by Universal Music Group for the concept of a music video for Avicii that would make him famous. Papahadjopoulos contacted Avicii to understand the symbolism behind "Levels" and to create a concept that would match the song. Papahadjopoulos created a concept based on Office Space, that he described as "about a man who wakes up to realize he is living in hell. Everyone around him just thinks he's crazy. But his craziness is infectious." Avicii later received the concept of the music video from his production manager, Arash Pournouri, and showed support for it. He posted the concept on his official website on 8 December 2011. Papahadjopoulos collaborated with Richie Greenfield for direction and choreography of the music video. It was ultimately released to YouTube on 29 November 2011.

Synopsis

The music video depicts a weary businessman, who is played by Richie Greenfield, working at an office. The businessman eventually starts dancing and writing "Avicii" on the tables and walls. A security guard walks into the office, brings out an electroshock weapon, and stuns the businessman unconscious. During the interlude with a sample from "Something's Got a Hold on Me", the man is dreaming of pushing a big boulder up a mountain, mirroring Sisyphus' fate. The music video then cuts to him being restrained to a table in the hospital. A flower blossoms from his mouth. Two hospital workers who were in the same room notices and walk towards the businessman. One of them picks up a piece of the flower, eats a part of it, and then touches it to the other hospital worker. As both of them are walking away, the businessman swallows the flower and he and the two hospital workers start dancing around the hospital. As the hospital workers dance in the hospital, everyone else in the hospital starts dancing against their will.

Symbolism
The intended symbolism of the music video was described in an early concept page on Avicii's website. The concept describes the idea that "we are already in Avici, and that maybe we at times are aware of this and the existence of other levels." It goes on to describe that reality is "an infinite loop of reality. Day in and day out. The reality looks just like our own, but shot through a gritty and unsaturated lens." The concept page then describes in a summary of the original concept story, how the symbolism ties into the music video: "We watch as the man’s reality implodes, he’s experiencing awareness of other levels and his entire reality all around him transforms to something new."

Track listing

Charts

Weekly charts

Year-end charts

Certifications

Release history

See also
 List of number-one dance singles of 2011 (U.S.)

Notes

References

2010 songs
2011 singles
Avicii songs
Song recordings produced by Avicii
Songs written by Avicii
Number-one singles in Norway
Number-one singles in Scotland
Number-one singles in Sweden
Songs written by Arash Pournouri
Geffen Records singles
Interscope Records singles
Etta James
Progressive house songs